Pančevo (Serbian Cyrillic: Панчево, ; ; ;) is a city and the administrative center of the South Banat District in the autonomous province of Vojvodina, Serbia. It is located on the shores of rivers Tamiš and Danube, in the southern part of Banat region. Since the 2011 census 123,414 people have been living in the Pančevo administrative area. Pančevo is the fourth largest city in Vojvodina and the ninth largest in Serbia by population.

Pančevo was first mentioned in 1153 and was described as an important mercantile place. It gained the status of a city in 1873 following the disestablishment of the Military Frontier in that region. For most of its period, it was the part of the Kingdom of Hungary and after 1920 it became part of the Kingdom of Serbs, Croats and Slovenes, which was renamed in 1929 to Yugoslavia. Since then with one interruption it was part of several Yugoslav states and after the dissolution of the latest in 2003, it is part of its successor state, Serbia. Pančevo is notable for being multi-ethnic, Serbs (and Germans until 1945) have been the dominant ethnic group since the 16th century and since 2011 they compose 80% of the total population of the city.

Pančevo is a city with rich cultural events and monuments, and in the past, it also used to be a filming location for many national and international movie productions. Since 2003 an international and multi-cultural carnival has been organized in the city. It is also the main economic center of the South Banat region and its economy is also mostly tied up to Belgrade's economy. HIP factory is located in Pančevo as well as UTVA which was heavily damaged during the bombing of Yugoslavia in 1999. Pančevo is also well known for its brewery and silk factory which were founded in the early 18th century, and as well as the light bulb factory which are all now defunct. Pančevo is also home to many historical objects, museums and parks.

Name
In Serbian and Macedonian, the town is known as Pančevo (Панчево), in Hungarian as Pancsova, in Slovak as Pánčevo, in Romanian as Panciova and in German as Pantschowa. The place name is probably derived from an old Slavonic term and meant location of marsh.

Geography
The altitude above sea level is 77 meters. The southern city quarters are located on the bank of the Danube, the western quarters to the bank of Tamiš. The Danube river islands Forkontumac and Čakljanac are southernmost part of urban area.

Climate
Pančevo has a humid subtropical climate (Köppen climate classification: Cfa).

History
In the late 19th and early 20th century many archaeological artifacts of the Stone Age period were found, remains of settlements and places of burial from the times of Bronze Age (Urnfield culture) and Ancient Rome on the urban area. Most of the objects are exhibited at the National Museum of the town.

In 1154, Arabic Muslim geographer Muhammad al-Idrisi described region in his Book of Pleasant Journeys into Faraway Lands as important mercantile place. Regional area was administered by Bulgarian Empire until early 11th century, then by Kingdom of Hungary until it became part of Ottoman Empire in 1521. During Turkish rule, region was part of the Temeşvar Eyalet and mostly populated by Serbs. In 1660, Evliya Çelebi described the town as quadrangular fortification being diameter of one hundred Turkish feet. During Austro-Turkish War, the fortification was conquered by mImperial troops under supreme command of Claude Florimond de Mercy in 1716. There is an impression of old city and its fortification recorded on maps from 1717 and 1720 which are located at National Széchényi Library and Institute of Military History in Budapest.

After the Treaty of Požarevac, urban area belonged to Habsburg Banat, and was Garrison place of temporarily stationed Regiments of Imperial Army. In December 1764, a military commission of Viennese Hofkriegsrat registered all people and number of more or less habitable houses, and Habsburg government encouraged massive immigration of German settlers for administrative furnishing and developing new district of Military Frontier. In January 1794, Francis II signed the charter of borough rights of Pančevo, there is no other real evidence like a deed of City founding. In 1852, fortification has been slighted for urban expanding. In 1873, the military frontier was abolished and Pančevo included into Torontál county of Austria-Hungary. In 1902, cadastral maps of the town were recorded which are located at the National Archives of Hungary.

After Austrian-Hungarian Armistice of Villa Giusti, region became part of provisional Torontalsko-tamiške županja and due to Treaty of Trianon finally Yugoslavian part, in 1922 structured into Belgrade oblast and since 1929 into Dunavska banovina from Kingdom of Yugoslavia.

Effects of World War II on City life

In April 1941, Pančevo was occupied during the invasion of Yugoslavia by Germany. On April 12, 1941, Wehrmacht soldiers committed a war crime massacre in the city when 36 Serbian people were murdered by hanging and shooting as reprisal for deaths of 9 volksdeutsche members of the paramilitary formation Mannschaft, a member of the SS Division Das Reich and a wounded comrade of that division, attacked by three men of the Royal Yugoslavian Army before state surrender. On April 11, 1941, Royal cavalry officers Stevan Rikanović, Saša Rakezić and Milan Orlić gave a signal during the German parade that they did not accept the looming Yugoslavian defeat. They erected temporary scaffolding behind a wall of a Catholic cemetery and fired at the Nazi Mannschaft, who after overcoming that surprise returned fire immediately, assisted by two SS men who had been seated in a nearby German Café. On April 6, 1941, members of Mannschaft already daubed anti-semitic slogans on some graves in this cemetery, some gravestones were badly damaged too, but they put on grave of George Weifert  a grave wreath with a decorated swastika ribbon. The following day, pro-German groups marched through all the streets, smashed windows of Serbian shops and taunted, spat and beat Serbian civilians because they must stay in their homes and it is not allowed them to go out. On April 17, 1941, there was a power demonstration with deployment of Mannschaft units in front of City hall square, and an incendiary speech by Kreisführer Otto Vogenberger from the balcony of the building, who spoke about liberation of regional Germans from Yugoslavian slavery and announced three days of celebrations until birthday of our Führer. On April 20, 1941, Kreisführer was personally gifted with a portrait of Hitler by Heinrich Knirr, who was visiting his beloved homeland. On May 1, 1941, selected policemen from the Banatian State Guard publicly sworn in at the same place with black uniforms and Totenkopf on their collar, speaking words like protecting rights and lives of German people, although they had already been recruited in April. Propaganda photos and film of the reprisal massacre were used decades after the event to help chronicle the Wehrmacht complicity atrocities during the war, often manipulated in German-language tv documentaries.

During World War II in Yugoslavia, Pančevo was part of Autonomous Banat within German-occupied Serbia. Selected Danube Swabian men were recruited and conscripted in Mannschaft, in Waffen-SS, the majority of them either in SS-Division Das Reich, in German Police or SS Freiwilligen Gebirgsjäger Division Prinz Eugen. More than 99.99 percent of local German women and youth were organized in formations Deutsche Frauenschaft, Deutsche Jugend inclusive DMB and dedicated to Nazism. In 1943, Südostdeutsche Forschungsgemeinschaft issued a very treacherously census with the note for official use only: there are amazing fifty eight orthodox Germans in it, which is a phrase for collaborators from Romanian origin. On August 28, 1944, top elite nazi funcionaries such as Vogenberger and Adelhardt, along with their valuable family members, were evacuated by special train via Novi Sad to Budapest on their own orders. Of course, they said goodbye with heroic speech like always in which they swore unconditional fidelity to final victory for Führer and fatherland. In 1944, after defeat of German Wehrmacht and Waffen-SS during Belgrade Offensive by Allied Armies, one part of the German people left the city, together with defeated German army. In November 1944, in cooperation with OZNA, a KNOJ brigade was set up to denazify the region, consisting of 20 elite partisans who volunteered to execute symbolic deterrent measures under supreme command of Brigade commander Svetozar Rupić. All measures began for the first time in January 1945 after intensive research and determination of the execution sites. The rest of German people remained in the country. These people were sent into local imprisonments which existed until 1948. After dissolution, many people of German population left Yugoslavia because of economic reasons. Since 1945, the city belonged to the Srez Pančevo of the Socialist Federal Republic of Yugoslavia and the Federal Republic of Yugoslavia. The city was the administrative center of the region from all these centuries to the present.

Administration

The administration of the municipality of Pančevo is structured in 9 local communities (Mesna zajednica, singular; abbreviation MZ) of seven villages, two towns and the city of Pančevo, structured in eight local communities of eight city districts with several quarters.

Administrative area structure

The administrative area differs to the historical administrative area. From 1946 to 1959, the historical municipality (Srez) was structured in 23 communities, including today's communities and the villages and cities of Baranda, Borča, Crepaja, Debeljača, Idvor, Kovačica, Opovo, Ovča, Padina, Sakule, Sefkerin, Uzdin and Vojlovica. The city district Vojlovica was added to the town in 1978.

City administrative structure

Demographics

Municipal area population

Demography of city population

Demography of municipal population by ethnicity

Culture

Cultural institutions and events

The oldest and most traditional cultural institution of the city is the Serbian Church Choral Society, founded in 1838 and the oldest still existing Choral Society of today's Serbia. Since its inception, probably the most famous of all honorable choirmasters is Davorin Jenko, who conducted the choir from 1863 to 1865. In the present, the choir is conducted for the fourth time in a continuous sequence by a woman. The most important Cultural Center of the city (Kulturni Centar Pančeva) is located in the former theater building of the city, founded in 1947 and named National Theater which realized play productions in cooperation with National Theater Novi Sad. In 1956, the political authorities of the town decided the creation of a cultural center which is representing variety of all Arts. The center has a gallery of Modern art, and it promotes continuous festivals like Biennial of Art (Bijenale umetnosti), the music festival Ethno.com and the Pančevački Jazz Festival with artists from all over the world. In addition, some theater productions are shown annually in cooperation with National Theater Belgrade and other famous institutions. In 2012, the center published all popular stories of Zigomar Comics in a collected edition. Since 1977, the House of Youth (Dom omladine) is venue of the event Rukopisi (Manuscripts) where young writers are presented each year. The facility also promotes many other events like FreeDOM Art Festival. There is also the continuous Film festival PAFF worth mentioning which has a good reputation beyond the region. In the past, the city has been filming location for many national and international movie productions, including well known movies such as La Tour, prends garde!, The Mongols, I Even Met Happy Gypsies, Balkan Express, Black Cat, White Cat and Coriolanus.

Since 2004, each year in June the Pančevački Carnival become the most important event of its kind in Serbia. The highlight of the event is the parade which goes through the center with more than over 3,000 international participants and up to 100,000 visitors annually. The city is a member of the Federation of European Carnival Cities.

The National Museum was founded in 1923 and it is located in former neoclassical city hall since several decades. The institution has a valuable permanent exhibition and it is one of the most important museums of Vojvodina. The Vajfert Brewery is located in the town's center and it is the oldest one of today's Serbia, founded in 1722 by Abraham Kepiš from Bratislava. The brewery was run by the Vajfert family for several generations and its most famous represent was Đorđe Vajfert. After closing in 2008 and a conflagration in 2010, the building complex was a ruin in recent years. In 2015, the city began to realize a concept for revitalizing the industrial heritage and in the following year, the Đorđe Vajfert Brewery Museum was opened in the presence of the Austrian and German ambassadors. In the same year, a new summer festival called Vajfert Days was held for the first time. The intention of the organizer is to promote the tourist, cultural, artistic and economic potential of the city. There is an archive of the city, founded in 1947 and it is located in former barracks of Austrian-Hungarian Army. The archive collects and preserves materials of town's history from all centuries.

Cultural monuments

Pančevo's Vojlovica monastery is one of the oldest monasteries of Vojvodina, the oldest sacral building complex of the city and declared Cultural Monument of Exceptional Importance. In 1542, the monastery was first mentioned by hegumen Jeronomah Parfenije in a Serbian almanac of Božidar Vuković. The church of the monastery is dedicated to Archangels Michael and Gabriel and was transformed into neoclassical stile towards the end of 18th century. From 1942 to 1944, some Orthodox dignitaries such as Gavrilo V were temporarily imprisoned in the monastery and the entire building complex was observed by members of Deutsche Mannschaft including obligation to regularly report for Banater Staatswache. The oldest church in town is the Roman Catholic Church Saint Charles Borromeo, built from 1756 to 1757 and in 1768, the building was extended with a steeple which was equipped with a turret clock in 1868 to mark its centenary. Its column in the square in front of the building with statue of Abraham and Isaac was built in 1722. The building was previously used as a provisional church of a Minorite monastery. The religious order provided the military chaplains for the garrison of the Imperial Army. The Serbian Orthodox Church Assumption of Holy Virgin was built from 1807 to 1811. The iconostasis of the church was designed by the painter Konstantin Danil from 1828 to 1833. The urban Institute for Protection of Cultural Monuments supports the maintenance and restoration of Pančevo's Cultural Heritage.

Media
The weekly newspaper Pančevac is oldest one of still existing print media in Serbia, founded in 1869, weekly newspaper Libertatea is most widely used print media of Romanians in Serbia, its first edition has been published in May 1945. The most used local mass media is RTV Pančevo. The TV station started broadcasting its programs in 1992.

Clubs 
There is a single but well known board game club in Pančevo. Founded in 2015, Klub d20 brings together people who love all kinds of games, as well as epic and science fiction.

It's meant to cater to all ages, from 5 to 105, to all those who are willing to learn something new through games and to get acquainted with new, non-classic board games of different kinds such as RPG, card and video.

The club also organizes movies nights and watching of TV series, as well as literary evenings and tribunes on appropriate topics. In the club you can find well over 100 board games which you can play in the club or rent for an affordable price and play in the comfort of your home. However, since it really is a hub of fun and games in Pančevo, most people prefer to bring their friends and enjoy board games in the club quarters.

Since the Covid-19 outbreak began the club has temporarily shut its doors but Pančevo residents and board game enthusiasts from afar are eagerly awaiting its reopening.

Economy

Pančevo is the economic center of South Banat District. There are many industrial companies in processing of oil, steel, aluminum, glass, corn, grain, in metalworking, in producing petrochemicals, fertilizer, commercial packaging, PET molding machines, clothes, grain mill products, bacon and other food, in construction of aircraft, thermal power stations and buildings of steel beams.

Pančevo's economy is tied up with Belgrade economy, as the distance between the cities is only 14 kilometers. The industrial site of NIS refinery is the largest one of all refineries in Serbia. In 1999, the industrial site was strategically bombed by NATO bombing of Yugoslavia.

Precise targets included the refinery, the town's airport, the Utva aircraft industry and HIP factory. The UNEP reported in studies about soil and groundwater contamination caused by NATO bombardment. The contamination is a long-term threat to natural environment and human health.

There are two protected natural resources located in surroundings of the city, the natural monument Ivanov's island (Serbian Ivanovačka ada) and the Nature Park Ponjavica.

The following table gives a preview of total number of registered people employed in legal entities per their core activity (as of 2018):

Public transportation

The most important road that runs through Pančevo is the European route E70 which forms a bypass around the city center, connecting the city with Belgrade. The IB-14 highway to Smederevo via Kovin starts here, and so does the IIA-130 highway to Ečka. As the most important regional mode of transport on road is made available a bus route network for public passenger traffic by Autotransport Pančevo since 1948.

Having a relatively small population, Pančevo has no less than four passenger railway stations: Pančevo Glavna stanica, Pančevo Varoš, Pančevo Strelište and Pančevo Vojlovica. Apart from these, Serbian Railways also serve some important industries, such as NIS oil refinery and HIP Azotara. In April 1894, the city was connected to the European railways net.

The municipality lies on left bank downriver of Danube which is one of the Europe's main waterways. The new harbor was built in 1947, Tamiš discharges into Danube just outside the town of Pančevo.

Sports
There are some popular sporting clubs in town, the football (soccer) team FK Železničar Pančevo, the women's football club ŽFK, the basketball club KK Tamiš and the American football team Pančevo Panthers. Currently, the most successful athlete is Slobodan Bitević who lives in the city. Dušan Borković is a Serbian auto racing driver from Pančevo. He was the two time European champion 2012 European Hill Climb Championship and 2015 European Touring Car Cup, and also a member of the National Assembly of Serbia from 2016 to 2020.

Landmarks 
One of the most prominent and famous parts of the city is the park. It is located in the very heart of Pančevo. The park and the Kralj Petar square represent the ''lungs'' of the city.

In late 2021, the reconstruction of the park began. JKP Zelenilo hired the Faculty of Forestry do a detailed estimate of the health of trees located in the park, the  JKP Vodovod i kanalizacija were hired to work on the reconstruction of the plumbing, rainwater and sewage pipes. The lightning system should also undergo reconstruction.

In March 2022 a small playground for children has been added in front of the Tax Administration office. This significantly altered the appearance of this part of the park since it was previously known only for the famous ''Sower'' statue.

Flora and Fauna

Birds 
Nature reserves near the city, the coastal areas of the rivers Tamis and Danube, as well as numerous islands, are a habitat for over 100 species of birds, 63 species of which are natural rarities.

The City Forest with over 300 hectares and the National Garden, the largest city park with almost 15 hectares, are located just a few minutes walk from the center of Pancevo and are home to many species of birds.

A particularly important bird habitat, in addition to the Ponjavica Nature Park and the Ivanovacka Ada Special Nature Reserve, is the Deliblato Sands Special Nature Reserve, which is partly located in Pancevo.

The notable bird species found in Pančevo are the white-tailed eagle, black storks, bullfinch and black-winged stilt.

The first lowland feeding ground in Serbia for the white-tailed eagle, which is on the list of endangered species, was built on the territory of Pancevo.

Image gallery

International relations

Twin towns - sister cities

Pančevo is twinned with:

 Bonyhád, Hungary
 Boulogne-Billancourt, France
 Byala Slatina, Bulgaria
 Kumanovo, North Macedonia
 Michalovce, Slovakia
 Mrkonjić Grad, Bosnia and Herzegovina
 Neapoli, Greece
 Prijedor, Bosnia and Herzegovina
 Ravenna Province, Italy
 Reșița, Romania
 Stavroupoli, Greece
 Stupino, Russia
 Voskresensk, Russia

Partnership
 Tarragona, Spain

People
Vasa Živković (1819–1891), poet and priest
Dragomir Krančević (1847–1929), violinist
Đorđe Vajfert (1850–1937), industrialist and Governor of the National Bank of Serbia and later Yugoslavia
Ljubica Luković (1858–1915), President of Circle of Serbian Sisters
Ludwig von Graff (1851–1924), zoologist
Heinrich Knirr (1862–1944), painter of official portrait of Adolf Hitler
Jovan Erdeljanović (1874–1944), ethnologist
Milan Ćurčin (1880–1960), poet and editor
Milorad Bata Mihailović (1923–2011), painter
Alexis Guedroitz (1923–1992), professor of Russian language and literature
Olja Ivanjicki (1931–2009), artist
Stevan Bena (1935–2012), football player
Zlatoje Martinov (*1953), journalist and writer
Zoran Gajić (*1958), volleyball trainer
Milan Orlić (*1962), laureate of several literary awards
Aleksandar Zograf (*1963), cartoonist
Slobodan Beštić (*1964), actor
Milenko Topić (*1969), basketball player, World and European champion
Bobby Despotovski (*1971), Australian footballer
Marinika Tepić (*1974), politician
Mirjana Pović (*1981), Astrophysicist
Marina Munćan (*1982), athlete, Universiade champion
Dušan Borković (*1984), auto racing driver, two time European champion.
Nađa Higl (*1987), swimmer, World champion 
Anja Crevar (*2000), swimmer, Gold medalist at the European Junior Championships
Kosta Novaković (*1996), strength & conditioning coach/rehab specialist, Serbian National Rowing Team Captain, "Little Miss Sunshine"
Nemanja Dangubić (*1993), basketball player

Articles

Bor
Pančevački Rit
List of cities in Serbia

References

External links
 Official Website by the City of Pančevo
 Official Website by Turistička organizacija Pančeva
 ABC of Pančevo, city's first website started in 1997.
 013info
 The local entertainment portal Pancevo Online and its YouTubeChannel
 Pančevo City
 Pančevo Moj Kraj
 News portal Južni Banat

 
Populated places in Serbian Banat
Populated places in South Banat District
Municipalities and cities of Vojvodina
South Banat District
Populated places on the Danube
Spatial Cultural-Historical Units of Great Importance

kk:Панчево (Кырджали облысы)